Clément Turpin (born 16 May 1982) is a French  football referee. He has been a FIFA listed referee since 2010, and an UEFA Elite group referee since 2012. Turpin has received several accolades for his work as a referee. He also works as a physical education teacher in France.

Career
Turpin became a FIFA referee in 2010. He has served as a referee in the 2014 and 2018 World Cup qualifiers.

He became a referee in UEFA club competitions from the 2010–11 UEFA Europa League.

In May 2016, Turpin was named the best French referee by the French Football Federation. The same year he officiated at the UEFA Euro 2016 in France and was one of the five UEFA referees for the Men's Olympic Games football tournament in Brazil.

The following year Turpin refereed in the 2017 FIFA U-17 World Cup in India.

On 29 March 2018, FIFA announced that Turpin would officiate at the 2018 FIFA World Cup in Russia, with Cyril Gringore and Nicolas Danos as assistant referees.

On 4 July 2020, he officiated the Oldest capital derby of Bulgaria between Levski Sofia and Slavia Sofia.

On 26 May 2021, he refereed the 2021 UEFA Europa League Final between Villarreal and Manchester United.

Turpin was selected by UEFA to officiate the 2022 UEFA Champions League Final between Liverpool and Real Madrid.

See also
List of football referees

References

External links

1982 births
Living people
French football referees
UEFA Champions League referees
UEFA Europa League referees
UEFA Euro 2016 referees
2018 FIFA World Cup referees
People from Oullins
Football referees at the 2016 Summer Olympics
UEFA Euro 2020 referees
2022 FIFA World Cup referees
FIFA World Cup referees
Sportspeople from Lyon Metropolis